Conca d'Oro is an underground station on Line B of the Rome Metro. It is located in the Monte Sacro quarter, under the large Piazza Conca d'Oro.

The works, which cost €513 million, started in October 2005. The station opened on 13 June 2012 and served as the temporary terminus of the Line B1 until 2015, when Jonio was opened.

References

External links

Rome Metro Line B stations
Railway stations opened in 2012
2012 establishments in Italy
Rome Q. XVI Monte Sacro
Railway stations in Italy opened in the 21st century